
Hans Heidtmann (8 August 1914 – 5 April 1976) was a German U-boat commander in World War II and recipient of the Knight's Cross of the Iron Cross of Nazi Germany

 under the command of Heidtmann came under attack by several British warships and an aircraft on 30 October 1942. Fatally damaged and forced to the surface, the U-boat was abandoned after scuttling herself in the Mediterranean. A British boarding party, consisting of Lieutenant Francis Anthony Blair Fasson, Able Seaman Colin Grazier, and Canteen Assistant Tommy Brown, from destroyer  recovered the cryptographic materials, but the U-boat sank before the Enigma cipher machine could be brought out. Eight German crewmen and two British seamen were lost, and 37 German survivors were taken prisoner of war.

Awards
 Wehrmacht Long Service Award 4th Class (8 April 1938)
 Spanish Cross in Bronze with Swords (6 June 1939)
 Sudetenland Medal (16 September 1939)
 U-boat War Badge (1939) (26 November 1939)
 Iron Cross (1939) 2nd Class (27 November 1939) & 1st Class (23 September 1941)
 Knight's Cross of the Iron Cross on 12 April 1943 as Kapitänleutnant and commander of U-559

References

Citations

Bibliography

 
 

1914 births
1976 deaths
U-boat commanders (Kriegsmarine)
German military personnel of the Spanish Civil War
Recipients of the Knight's Cross of the Iron Cross
Military personnel from Lübeck
Reichsmarine personnel
German Navy personnel